Highway 791 is a provincial highway in the north-east region of the Canadian province of Saskatchewan. It runs from Highway 120 to Paddockwood, where it becomes the Paddockwood Access Road. Highway 791 is about 14 km (9 mi) long.

See also 
Roads in Saskatchewan
Transportation in Saskatchewan

References 

791